Mai Chen is a New Zealand and Harvard educated lawyer with a professional and specialist focus in constitutional and administrative law, Waitangi tribunal and courts, human rights, white collar fraud and regulatory defence, judicial review, regulatory issues, education law, and public policy and law reform.  Chen is a barrister and holds an office in the Public Law Toolbox Chambers. She is an adjunct professor at the University of Auckland School of Law.  Having served previously in the University's Business School. Chen is also the Chair of New Zealand Asian Leaders, SUPERdiverse WOMEN and the Superdiversity Institute for Law, Policy and Business. She is married to Dr John Sinclair and the two have one son.

Chen has featured in Forbes magazine, TEDx talks and the National Business Review (NBR) and was a finalist for the New Zealander of the year award.

Early life

Born in Taipei, Taiwan, Chen immigrated to New Zealand with her family at the age of six in 1970. Hers was the first Taiwanese family on the South Island of New Zealand.  She studied at Otago Girls' High School, where she became a head girl, dux.

Education and scholarships

Chen attended the University of Otago (New Zealand) and graduated with a Bachelor of Laws Honours degree (first class) in 1986. She was admitted to the bar in the same year. 
Chen was awarded several scholarships, including the William Georgetti Scholarship granted by the New Zealand Governor-General, the Sir Harold Barrowclough Scholarship and the Butterworths Travelling Scholarship. 
In 1987 Chen was awarded the Frank Knox Memorial Fellowship to study at  Harvard Law School. Chen graduated with her Master of Laws from Harvard Law School in 1988 and won the Irving Oberman Memorial Award for the best Human Rights thesis at Harvard Law School. Her thesis was on the Treaty of Waitangi. 
Following Harvard Law School, Chen was awarded the Ferguson Human Rights Fellowship, a scholarship granted by the Harvard Human Rights Programme to be a Fellow at the International Labour Office in Geneva working on United Nations' Women's Convention and the ILO Indigenous Peoples Convention.

Career
Chen interned at the United Nations' International Labour Office in Geneva in 1988. 
In 1989, Chen took up a lectureship at the law school at Victoria University of Wellington, and wrote her first book on the discrimination of women under the UN Convention on the Elimination of Discrimination against Women. In 1990, she chaired a government review on the Policy of Excluding Women from Combat, and in 1992 she became the youngest senior lecturer in Law in New Zealand at that time. In 1993, she co-authored Public Law in New Zealand with former Prime Minister Rt Hon Sir Geoffrey Palmer QC, which was published by Oxford University Press.
In 1994, Chen became a lawyer at Russell McVeagh, but left after one year to co-found Chen and Palmer.

In September 2022, Chen left her role as Senior Partner of Chen Palmer to go to the Bar.

Chen Palmer

In November 1994, Chen set up the law firm Chen and Palmer alongside former New Zealand Prime Minister Rt Hon Sir Geoffrey Palmer QC. Chen bought out Sir Geoffrey Palmer when he left to head the Law Commission.
In 2013, Chen opened an Auckland office after failing to make headway in her first attempt. 

Chen Palmer has been a market leader in the private practice of public law. Chen Palmer won the Best Boutique Law Firm in 2010, and Best Public Law Firm in the New Zealand Law Awards from 2007-2011, and 2013, and was a finalist in the Employment Law Awards in 2011. Chen Palmer was one of New Zealand's first boutique law firms and was Australasia's first "Washington-style" law firm specialising in legislation and public policy.

Other
In April 2015, Chen was appointed, as a director, to the Board of BNZ (Bank of New Zealand), one of New Zealand's largest banks. 
Chen is also chair on the People and Remuneration Committee, as well as sitting on the NZ Audit Committee and the Risk Committee.

Chen is an adjunct professor at the Faculty of Law at the University of Auckland.  Prior to this, Chen was an adjunct professor in Commercial and Public Law at the University of Auckland Business School. Chen was also made an honorary lecturer at Victoria University of Wellington. Chen has also sat on the Trade for All Advisory Board, the Securities Commission of New Zealand, the Advisory Board of AMP Life Limited (NZ), the New Zealand Board of Trade and Enterprise's Beachheads Programme, the Asia New Zealand Foundation, the Royal NZ Ballet Board, and on the Wellington Polytechnic and Victoria University of Wellington Councils. She was President of the Harvard New Zealand Alumni Association (NZ) for eight years . Chen is a member of the New Zealand Law Society Public and Administrative Law Committee, and the New Zealand China Council.

In May 2015, Chen established the Superdiversity Institute on Law, Policy and Business, undertaking research into the impact of cultural and linguistic diversity on discrimination law and policy, on electoral laws, Health and Safety legislation implementation and on parties in the Courts. Chen also established the New Zealand Asian Lawyers to increase an understanding of the issues and challenges, and to improve the contribution and practice, of Asian lawyers and Asian clients.

Voluntary work
Chen is founder and Chair of the Superdiversity Institute, and was the founder and previous chair of New Zealand Asian Leaders, that connects top Asian NZ lawyers, CEOs and emerging leaders with New Zealand companies doing business in Asia to enhance their success to help NZ Inc. She also helped to establish the Pacifica Leadership Academy at BEST Pacific Institute of Education, formerly led by Beatrice Faumuina. Chen is also the founder and President of New Zealand Asian Lawyers. Chen is the inaugural chair of Global Women, which is a not for profit charitable organisation for top women leaders in the public, private and not for profit sectors which mentors emerging leaders. Chen, as part of her pro-bono work, organises and hosts a number of seminars and events across Auckland to bring together the New Zealand's top legal specialists.

In July 2013, Chen also launched willtolive.co.nz, a low-cost provider of templated wills for young people.
Chen has done a wide range of pro bono work, including for the Auckland Zoo, New Zealand Endometriosis Foundation and He Huarahi Tamariki (the school for Teenage Parents in Tawa). Chen has also provided pro bono advice to the Bilingual Leo Pacific Coalition. Chen was President of the Harvard Law School Alumni Association (New Zealand) for ten years, and was a trustee of the Royal New Zealand Ballet Board for four and a half years.

From 1982 to 1986 Chen did voluntary work with street kids referred by the Department of Social Welfare, including the establishment of a Modern Dance Group for girls .

Chen has previously sat on the Yvonne Smith Scholarship Committee which awards scholarships to women, including those whom want to study post-graduate law. She also was a member of the selection panel for the New Zealander of the Year award in 2019.

Honours and prizes

Recent and notable appearances
Supreme Court

 Donglin Deng v Lu Zheng – SC 5/2021. Chen appeared as counsel for the Law Society, whose intervention the Court invited to advise on the interpretation of documents translated from Mandarin and the cultural setting in an arrangement between two Chinese parties whose business relationship appeared to have been conducted in Mandarin.
 Unison Networks Ltd v Commerce Commission [2008] 1 NZLR 42. Chen was the counsel for Vector Ltd, which was an intervenor in the proceedings. We made written submissions, but the Court decided not to hear oral submissions from Vector after two days of hearings. Chen was led by Alan Galbraith QC.

Court of Appeal

 Attorney-General v Problem Gambling Foundation of New Zealand [2016] NZCA 609. Chen was counsel for the respondent.
 Attorney-General v Unitec Institute of Technology [2006] NZCA 317. Chen was counsel for the respondent.
 Hosking v Runting & Ors [2004] NZCA 34; [2005] 1 NZLR 1. Chen was counsel for the appellant. Led by Bill Wilson QC.
 Inatio Akaruru v Tiaki Wuatai and Chief Electoral Officer, 2001, Cook Islands Court of Appeal, Civil Division. Chen was counsel for the appellant, Sir Geoffrey Henry.
 Exide Technologies Ltd v Attorney-General [2011] NZCA 651. Chen was counsel for the appellant.
 McRitchie v Taranaki Fish and Game Council [1999] 2 NZLR 139. Chen was counsel for the respondent. Led by Sir Geoffrey Palmer.
 Capital Coast Health Ltd v New Zealand Medical Laboratory Workers Union Inc [1996] 1 NZLR. Chen was counsel for the appellant. Led by Phillip Green.

High Court

 Te Pou Matakana Limited v The Whānau Ora Community Clinic & Ors- CIV-2022-485-569. Chen is lead counsel for the respondents and the matter is ongoing.
 Rimmington v Waikato Regional Council and another CIV-2022-419-120 – discontinued on 16 August 2022.
 Application by Te Rūnanga o Ngāti Whātua for orders recognizing customary marine title and protected customary rights (CIV-2017-404-563).
 Winton Property Investments Limited v Minister of Finance and Others [2022] NZHC 638.
 Jones and PPTA v Teaching Council of Aotearoa New Zealand / Matatu Aotearoa [2021] NZHC 1581. Chen was counsel for the respondent.
 Parrot Society of New Zealand Incorporated v Auckland Council (CIV-2020-404-1735). Chen was counsel for the applicant. This matter was settled before trial.
 Andrew Lowe Trustee Company No. 2 Ltd v Dahlenburg CIV-2020-404-1718. Chen was lead counsel for the first and second plaintiffs. This matter was settled before trial.
 E R Bellas Limited v Karikari Charitable Trust Incorporated [2020] NZHC 2517. The costs judgment was released in R Bellas Limited v Karikari Charitable Trust Incorporated [2020] NZHC 3262, where Chen acted for the respondent.
 Discoveries Educare Target Road Limited and Others v Secretary of Education CIV 2020-404- 749 & CIV 2019-485-560. This was three proceedings consolidated into one. Chen was counsel for the plaintiff. Chen argued the interlocutory application for interim orders and subsequent to that hearing, the Crown agreed to defer implementation of the Secretary of Education’s three cancellation notices until the judicial review application had been determined. The matter was settled the week before the judicial review hearing in the Wellington High Court.
 Bus and Coach Association (New Zealand) Incorporated v Attorney-General [2020] NZHC 1474 (decision on interim orders application) and 1559 (reasons). Chen was counsel for the plaintiff. These decisions relate to an interlocutory application for interim orders. The proceedings were withdrawn before the matter went to a substantive hearing.
 Chief Executive of Land Information New Zealand v Agria (Singapore) PTE Limited and Lai Guanglin [2019] NZHC 514. Chen was counsel for the defendant.
 Department of Internal Affairs v Qian Duoduo Limited [2018] NZHC 1887. Chen was counsel for the defendant.
 New Zealand College of Midwives Inc v Attorney-General CIV-2015-485-685. Chen was counsel for the plaintiff. This matter was settled before trial.
 Problem Gambling Foundation of New Zealand v Attorney-General [2015] NZHC 1701. Chen was counsel for the plaintiff.
 New Zealand Motor Caravan Association v Thames-Coromandel District Council [2014] NZHC 2016. Chen was counsel for the plaintiff.
 New Zealand Motor Caravan Association v Westland District Council CIV-2013-418-5. Chen was counsel for plaintiff. This matter was settled before trial.
 Green v Waitangi Tribunal [2014] NZHC 723. Chen was counsel for the intervener.
 Board of Trustees of Phillipstown School v Minister of Education [2013] NZHC 2641. Chen was counsel for the plaintiff.
 Williams v New Zealand First Party CIV 2014-404-2172. Chen was counsel for the plaintiff. This matter was settled before trial.
 Conservative Party v Electoral Commission CIV-2014-404-2098. Chen was counsel for the plaintiff. This matter was settled before trial.
 Board of Trustees of Salisbury Residential School v Attorney-General [2012] NZHC 3348. Chen was counsel for the plaintiff.
 Exide Technologies Ltd v Attorney-General HC Wellington CIV-2011-485-1549, 16 September 2011. Chen was counsel for the plaintiff.
 The Australian and New Zealand Association of Oral and Maxillofacial Surgeons Inc v The Dental Council of New Zealand CIV 2009 485 2475. Chen was counsel for the plaintiff. This matter was settled before trial.
 Bierre v Clark CIV-2008-404-7235. Chen was counsel for the plaintiff. This matter was settled before trial.
 Unitec Institute of Technology v Attorney-General [2006] NZLR 65. Chen was counsel for the plaintiff.
 Whangamata Marina Society Inc v Attorney-General [2007] I NZLR 252. Chen was counsel for the plaintiff.
 JH Tamihere & Ors v E Taumaunu & Ors CIV 2005-404-6958. Chen was counsel for the first and second defendants.
 Smithkline Beecham (NZ) Ltd v Minister of Health (2002) 16 PRNZ 361 (HC). Chen was counsel for the plaintiff.
 Manawatu Polytechnic & Anor v Attorney-General & Ors HC Wellington CP 324-97, 2 September 1998. Chen was counsel for the third and fourth respondents, Wellington Polytechnic and Massey University. A competitor of the Manawatu Polytechnic sued to prevent the merger proceeding between Wellington Polytechnic and Massey University.
 Board of Airline Representatives New Zealand Inc & Ors v Attorney-General & Anor HC Wellington CP 391-98, 8 December 1998. Chen was co-counsel for the plaintiffs along with John Eichelbaum, who was a partner at Chen Palmer at the time.
 Taranaki Fish and Game Council v McRitchie [1998] 3 NZLR 611. Chen was counsel for the appellant.
 New Zealand Association of Residential Care Homes Inc v Northern Regional Health Authority, unreported, High Court, Auckland Registry, CP 522/96, 18 December 1996, Temm J. Chen was co-counsel for the plaintiff along with Dr David Cairns, who was a partner at Chen Palmer at the time.
 Ryan v Disciplinary Committee of the Pharmaceutical Society of New Zealand & Ors HC Wellington CP 79-94, 8 June 1994. Chen was counsel for the plaintiff.
 CIV-2022-419-0120: Rimmington v Waikato Regional Council & Anor.

Māori Land Court

 Cross-application of Te Rūnanga o Ngāti Whātua concerning the bed of the Hoteo River, A20200013952, 2021 – Lead counsel on behalf of Te Rūnanga o Ngāti Whātua. 

District Court

 Lane v Teaching Council of Aotearoa New Zealand (CIV-2020-085-000581). Chen was counsel for the respondent.
 MPI vs Allan Angus/Epicurean 2019 NZDC 21845. Chen was counsel for the defendant Epicurean. Chen argued two applications for name suppression for the defendant before the Court. A plea bargain was negotiated and the client ultimately pleaded guilty. The final appearance was undertaken by another partner at Chen Palmer.
 Auckland City Council v Morlan Tong [2015] NZDC 19242. Chen was counsel for the defendant.

Employment Court

 NZ Medical Laboratory Workers Union Inc v Capital Coast Health Ltd EC Wellington WEC 45/94, 12 August 1994. Chen was counsel for the defendant. Led by Phillip Green.

Human Rights Review Tribunal

 Sy v Ministry of Business, Innovation and Employment (HRRT 029/2020). 
 IHC New Zealand v Ministry of Education (Non-party Access to Tribunal File) [2013] NZHRRT 2.

Alcohol Regulatory & Licensing Authority

 Karikari Charitable Trust Incorporated v E R Bellas Limited [2020] NZARLA 106.

Disciplinary Tribunal of the New Zealand Institute of Chartered Accountants

 Disciplinary Tribunal of the New Zealand Institute of Chartered Accountants, 15 June 2020, under the New Zealand Institute of Chartered Accountants Act and the Rules made thereunder.

Employment Relations Authority

 Labour Inspector v Sail City Venture Limited and Anor [2020] NZERA 268.
 Hua XU and 29 others & National Personnel Limited 3051252, 2019.
 Labour Inspector v E Ming Limited [2018] NZERA 196.
 Webber v Midlands Health Network Ltd (Auckland) [2015] NZERA 47.

Immigration and Protection Tribunal

 Tingjia Li v the Immigration and Protection Tribunal [2018] NZHC 174..
 CP (Entrepreneur Residence Visa) [2018] NZIPT 204934.

Waitangi Tribunal

 Raukura Hauora O Tainui Trust (Wai 3019, #2.1.1.
 Decision on application for an urgent hearing, WAI 745 and 1308 (2019) (Waitangi Tribunal).
 The Kōhanga Reo claim filed by the Te Kōhanga Reo National Trust, WAI 2336 (2012) (Waitangi Tribunal).
 The Aotearoa Claim concerning Te Wānanga o Aotearoa, WAI 1298 (2005) (Waitangi Tribunal).
 He Maunga Rongo: Report on the Central North Island Claims (WAI 1200, Wellington Legislation Direct, 2008) (Waitangi Tribunal).
 Claim by James Pohio and the descendants of Ngati Mutunga (1988 to 2004) (WAI 65).
 The Wai 45 (Muriwhenua) record of inquiry. The hearing was held from 2 to 7 September 2012 at Kareponia Marae, Awanui, and on 18 and 19 September at the Environment Court in Auckland.

Books and publications
 Cultural Capability and Business Success Report: 5 top business leaders making cultural capability a cornerstone of their success, Superdiversity Institute of Law, Policy and Business, 2022
 Culturally, ethnically and linguistically diverse parties in the Courts: a Chinese case study, Superdiversity Institute of Law, Policy and Business, 2019. 
 National Culture and its Impact on Workplace Health and Safety and Injury Prevention for Employers and Workers, Superdiversity Institute of Law, Policy and Business, 2019. 
 Chen, M. & Erakovic, L. (2019). “Diverse thinking in New Zealand boardrooms: Looking through rose-coloured glasses”, paper accepted for presentation at EURAM Conference, Lisbon, 26-28 June 2019.
 Health and safety regulators in a superdiverse context: Review of challenges and lessons from United Kingdom, Canada and Australia, Superdiversity Institute of Law, Policy and Business, 2018. 
 Diverse Thinking Capability Audit of New Zealand Boardrooms 2018, Superdiversity Institute of Law, Policy and Business, 2018. 
 The Diversity Matrix: Updating What Diversity Means For Discrimination Laws in the 21st Century, Superdiversity Institute for Law, Policy and Business, 2017. 
 Superdiversity Stocktake: Implications for Business, Government and New Zealand, Superdiversity Institute for Law, Policy and Business, 2015. 
 Superdiversity, Democracy & New Zealand’s Electoral & Referenda Laws, Superdiversity Institute for Law, Policy and Business, 2015. 
 Contributed to James Kouzes, Barry Posner with Michael Bunting Extraordinary Leadership in Australia & New Zealand (John Wiley & Sons Australia, Ltd, 2015)
 Public Law Toolbox (2 edition) Lexis Nexis, December 2014. 
 Transforming Auckland: The Creation of Auckland Council LexisNexis, April 2013. 
 Public Law Toolbox LexisNexis, March 2012. 
 "Post-settlement implications for Crown/Māori relations" in Nicola Wheen and Janine Hayward (eds) Treaty of Waitangi Settlements Law Foundation and Bridget Williams Books, 2012
 "A Public Law Toolbox Perspective on the Ombudsman’s Role After 50 Years” (paper presented to the 10th World Conference of the International Ombudsman Institute, 14 – 16 November 2012, Wellington)
 “Discrimination in New Zealand: A Personal Journey” in Adrien Katherine Wing (ed) Global Critical Race Feminism: An International Reader (New York University Press, New York, 2000) 129-140
 “Scoping Paper on the Privacy Act 1993”, prepared for Hon Margaret Wilson, Associate Minister of Justice, 27 April 2001
 Government Review of the Policy Concerning Women in Combat: Report of the Working Party on Women in Combat (1990)
 “The Reconfiguration of the State and the Appropriate Scope of Judicial Review” in J Boston (ed) State Under Contract (Bridget Williams Books, Wellington, 1995)
 “Law and Economics and the Case for Discrimination Law” in The University, Ethics and Society (Combined Chaplaincies at Victoria University of Wellington, Wellington, 1995)
 Mai Chen and Rt Hon Professor Sir Geoffrey Palmer Public Law in New Zealand: Cases, Materials, Commentary and Questions (Oxford University Press, Auckland, 1993). 
 Women and Discrimination: New Zealand and the UN Convention (Institute of Policy Studies, Wellington, 1989).

Major articles and papers
 Susan Glazebrook J & Mai Chen “Tikanga and Culture in the Supreme Court: Ellis and Deng” Amicus Curiae Journal Vol 4, No. 2 (2023): Series 2, published on 6 March 2023. 
 David Goddard J & Mai Chen “Article: Putting a Social and Cultural Framework on the Evidence Act” Amicus Curiae Journal Vol. 4 No. 1 (2022): Series 2, published on 2 November 2022. 
 Mai Chen & Andrew Godwin “Culturally and Linguistically Diverse Parties in Australian courts – Insights from New Zealand” (2022) Issue Paper, to be launched on 12 September 2022. 
 David Goddard J & Mai Chen “Putting a Social and Cultural Framework on the Evidence Act: Recent New Zealand Supreme Court Guidance” (2022). Presentations to a seminar on the Supreme Court decision in Deng v Zheng [2022] NZSC 76.
 “The Supreme Court, Confucianism and Western values and the impact on the law”, LawTalk, Issue 946, June 2021. 
 “Latest cases on CALD parties in litigation and lessons from the Court of Appeal in Zheng”, (April 2021) Employment Law Bulletin
 “Lawyers need to do more to ensure CALD clients get equal access to justice in courts”, LawTalk, Issue 935, December 2020. 
 “CALD parties before the Employment Relations Authority”, LawTalk, Issue 939, May 2020. 
 “Judicial leadership on equal access to justice for Culturally and Linguistically Diverse Parties in Courts”, LawTalk, Issue 938, April 2020. 
 “Unique issues and challenges faced by culturally, ethnically and linguistically diverse parties in court” [2019] New Zealand Law Journal 393. 
 “Ensuring ethnically diverse workers do not suffer greater injury and illness”, LawTalk, Issue 925, February 2019. 
 “The Importance of Diverse Thinking for the Legal Profession”, LawTalk, Issue 922, October 2018. 
 “Cultural Differences”, Safeguard Magazine, September/October 2018
 “Multiple Ground Discrimination: A 21st century necessity” LawTalk, Issue 902, 2 December 2016. 
 New Zealand Lawyer, Issue 177: “The Public Law Toolbox” – 10 February 2012
 New Zealand Lawyer, Issue 159: “New Zealand Parliament’s love affair with fast law-making and urgency” – 6 May 2011
 Mai Chen “New Zealand’s Ombudsmen Legislation: The Need for Amendments after Almost 50 Years” (2010) 40(4) VUWLR 723. This published the paper from “A Public Law Toolbox Perspective on the Ombudsman’s Role After 50 Years” (paper presented to the 10th World Conference of the International Ombudsman Institute, 14 – 16 November 2012, Wellington)
 New Zealand Lawyer, Issue 137: Why Ombudsman Matter and Why the Ombudsman Act needs Reform” – 28 May 2010, pp10-13
 New Zealand Lawyer, Issue 143: “The Relevance of Public Law to Business” – 20 August 2010, pp 10-12
 New Zealand Lawyer, Issue 107: The changing legislative and regulatory environment under the new Government – the first one hundred days – 8 March 2009
 New Zealand Lawyer, Issue 111: Is the MMP referendum likely to result in electoral reform? – 4 May 2009
 New Zealand Lawyer, Issue 115: The Impact of the Regulatory Reform Bill and Taskforce – 26 June 2009
 New Zealand Lawyer, Issue 117: The Government’s decision not to regulate franchising – can it be changed? – 24 July 2009
 New Zealand Lawyer, Issue 123: “Education (Polytechnics) Amendment Bill 2009: A Major Law Reform in the Polytechnic Sector” – 16 October 2009
 New Zealand Lawyer, Issue: 126: “Strengthening the Protection of Private Property: The Regulatory Responsibility Taskforce 2009 and Revised Bill” – 11 December 2009, pp10-11
 “Auckland Local Government Reforms” (August 2009) New Zealand Law Journal 316
 Mai Chen & Richard Harker “Commerce Amendment Act 2008” (November 2008) New Zealand Law Journal 421
 New Zealand Lawyer, Issue 82: The legislative and regulatory outlook in election year 2008 – 22 February 2008
 New Zealand Lawyer, Issue 84: Greater regulation of financial advice; getting the balance right? – 20 March 2008
 New Zealand Lawyer, Issue 86: Advising clients on the Electoral Finance Act – 18 April 2008
 New Zealand Lawyer, Issue 92: Revealing Public Law’s holy book – 11 July 2008
 New Zealand Lawyer, Issue 96: Liquor Reform: good government or good politics? – 5 September 2008
 New Zealand Lawyer, Issue 97: Reflections on the fifteenth anniversary of the MMP referendum – 19 September 2008
 New Zealand Lawyer, Issue 98: Setting the scene: The Electoral Finance Act 2007 in context – 3 October 2008
 New Zealand Lawyer, Issue 99: The Real Estate Agents Act 2008: A warning to other professions? – 17 October 2008
 New Zealand Lawyer, Issue 100: When is a litigation problem really a legislative problem? – 31 October 2008
 New Zealand Lawyer, Issue 59: The Government agenda for 2007 from a public law perspective – 2 March 2007
 New Zealand Lawyer, Issue 61: Regulate or Ban? Party Pills and Public Law Issues – 30 March 2007
 New Zealand Lawyer, Issue 62: The Diagnostic Medlab case: pushing the boundaries of public law, or just an unusual set of law & facts?– 13 April 2007
 New Zealand Lawyer, Issue 64: Enforcement and Penalties under the Therapeutic Products and Medicines Bill: Joint Regime or Australian Regime? – 11 May 2007
 New Zealand Lawyer, Issue 66: Decision making on climate change policy and legislation: will New Zealand be ready for the first commitment period on 1 January 2008? – 8 June 2007
 New Zealand Lawyer, Issue 68: The Education (Tertiary Reforms) Amendment Bill – reforming the sector or eroding academic freedom? – 6 July 2007
 New Zealand Lawyer, Issue 70: Review of Parts 4A, 4 and 5 of the Commerce Act: A New Regulatory Dawn? – 3 August 2007
 New Zealand Lawyer, Issue 72: Reform of the Real Estate Agents Act 1976: Some constitutional issues – 31 August 2007
 New Zealand Lawyer, Issue 74: Section 19 of the Crown Entities Act: does illegality mean invalidity? – 28 September 2007
 New Zealand Lawyer, Issue 76: The Government’s recent climate change announcements: public law issues – 26 October 2007
 New Zealand Lawyer, Issue 78: The Royal Commission of Inquiry on Auckland: Public Law Issues – 23 November 2007
 New Zealand Lawyer, Issue 79: Getting the balance right : Privacy, the free flow of information and the Births, Deaths, Marriages, and Relationships Registration Amendment Bill
 “Crown Entities Act : 18 months on” (September 2006) New Zealand Law Journal 315
 New Zealand Lawyer, Issue 33: Sore Loser or Defender of Democracy? Peters v Clarkson; and 2006 from a Public Law Perspective – 10 February 2006
 New Zealand Lawyer, Issue 35: An underutilised public law tool? The first 15 years of the New Zealand Bill of Rights Act 1990 10 March 2006
 New Zealand Lawyer, Issue 37: The Constitutional Future of the Treaty of Waitangi: will the Courts play a role? – 7 April 2006
 New Zealand Lawyer, Issue 39: Private Companies and Public Duties – a Cautionary Tale – 5 May 2006
 New Zealand Lawyer, Issue 41: A fresh look at Regulation: Trends and Likely Outcomes – 2 June 2006
 New Zealand Lawyer, Issue 43: Evaluating the First Eighteen Months of the Crown Entities Act – 30 June 2006
 New Zealand Lawyer, Issue 45: Successful Government Contracting – understanding the unique characteristics of the Government as a contracting party – 28 July 2006
 New Zealand Lawyer, Issue 47: Local Government – Three years into the learning curves – 25 August 2006
 New Zealand Lawyer, Issue 49: Student Discipline from the Public Law Perspective – 22 September 2006
 New Zealand Lawyer, Issue 51: The Whangamata Marina Case: Crossing the Rubicon, Part 1 of 2 – 20 October 2006
 New Zealand Lawyer, Issue 53: The Whangamata Marina Case: Crossing the Rubicon, Part 2 – 17 November 2006
 “Is Judicial Independence under Threat in New Zealand?”, Triennial Judges Conference, Rotorua, 31 March 2003
 New Zealand Law Society Seminar Delegated Legislation, May 2002, “Part II: Practical problems for practitioners with regulations”, pages 57-97
 “A Constitutional Revolution? The Role of the New Zealand Parliament in Treaty-making” (2001) New Zealand Universities Law Review 448-474
 “Ratifying the Kyoto Protocol by September 2002: Policy and Legislative Implications” [2001] New Zealand Law Journal 443
 “The Changing Shape of the Public Sector Under the Labour-Led Coalition Government” [2001] New Zealand Law Journal 207
 “Crown Entities” [2001] New Zealand Law Journal 257
 “Unfinished Business: The Evolving Role of Parliament in Executive Treaty-Making in New Zealand”, Australian and New Zealand Society of International Law — American Society of International Law Proceedings of Joint Meeting 2000, 227-263
 “Inquiries and reviews under the Labour/Alliance Government”, LawTalk, Issue 537, 3 April 2000
 “Organising the Executive under a Change Constitution : What should be included?”, Building the Constitution Conference, (Institute of Policy Studies, Wellington, 2000)
 “Better Enforcing the Women’s Rights Convention” in Paul Hunt (ed) Human Rights – How are they best protected? Proceedings of a seminar organised by New Zealand Law Society, Commonwealth Human Rights Initiative, International Commission of Jurists (New Zealand Section) (Human Rights Commission, Auckland, 1998)
 “Improving Enforcement of the Women’s Rights Convention” (1996) 2 Human Rights Law and Practice 19
 “Parliament And Law-making Under MMP: The New Standing Orders”, in Conference Papers – The 1996 New Zealand Law Conference (1996) vol 1, 132
 “MMP and Further Reconfiguration of the State?” [1995] New Zealand Law Journal 158
 “Accountability of SOEs & Crown-owned Companies: Judicial Review, the New Zealand Bill of Rights Act and the impact of MMP” [1994] New Zealand Law Journal 296
 “The Introduction of Mixed-member Proportional Representation in New Zealand – Implications for Lawyers” (1994) 5 Public Law Review 104
 “Judicial review of state-owned enterprises at the crossroads” (1994) 24 Victoria University of Wellington Law Review 51
 “Self-regulation or State Regulation? Discrimination in Clubs” (1993) 15 New Zealand Universities Law Review 421
 “Judicial Review under the Health and Disability Services Act 1993” (1993) 16(4) Public Sector 20
 “MMP to expand lawyer influence, increase parliamentary scrutiny” (1993) Issue 406, LawTalk, 19
 “Protective Laws and the Convention on the Elimination of All Forms of Discrimination Against Women” (1993) 15(1) Women’s Rights Law Reporter 1
 “The Impact of the New Human Rights Act 1993: Disability and Age Discrimination” (1993) 91 Australian and New Zealand Equal Opportunity Law and Practice Reporter, “New Developments” 705
 “Remedying New Zealand’s Constitution in Crisis: Is MMP part of the answer?” [1993] New Zealand Law Journal 22
 “Discrimination, Law, and Being a Chinese Immigrant Woman in New Zealand” [1993] 9(2) Women’s Studies Journal 1-29
 “The Inadequacies of New Zealand’s Discrimination Law” [1992] New Zealand Law Journal 137
 “Reforming New Zealand’s Anti-Discrimination Law” [1992] New Zealand Law Journal 172
 “A Lawyer’s Perspective on Māori and Gender Issues in the 1990 General Elections” in EM McLeay (ed) The 1990 General Election: Perspectives on Political Change in New Zealand Occasional Publication No.3 (Department of Politics, Victoria University of Wellington, Wellington, 1991) 91
 “The Experience of an LLM Student at Harvard Law School” [1990] New Zealand Law Journal 8
 “Customary Māori Fishing Rights” [1989] New Zealand Law Journal 233
 “Avoiding Compromise Agreements for Unjust Effect: An Evaluation of the Courts’ Approach to section 21(8)(b) Matrimonial Property Act 1976” (1987) 6 Otago Law Review 440

Media appearances
 Sunday Café with Mel Homer 15 January 2023.
 TV3 Newshub Nation 10 September 2022.
 Newshub (explaining whether the Labour Party can release a video featuring shot of Dr Ashley Bloomfield, Director- General of Health and Chief Executive) 23 August 2022.
 The AM Show (explaining what Prime Minister Jacinda Ardern’s options are for delaying the election amid the COVID-19 pandemic) 17 August 2020.
 RadioNZ Checkpoint with Linda Owen (discussing charging returning New Zealanders for managed isolation) 28 July 2020.
 RadioNZ The Panel (discussing a new law providing a legal framework for COVID-19 Alert Level 2) 12 May 2020.
 RadioNZ The Panel (discussing the realities of racism in New Zealand due to COVID-19) 5 May 2020.

 Forbes Magazine (discussing COVID-19, leadership and superdiversity) 30 April 2020.
 RadioNZ with Linda Clark (discussing New Zealand’s COVID- 19 response) 26 April 2020.
 RadioNZ The Panel (discussing various subjects) 22 April 2020.
 RadioNZ The Panel (on various subjects) 19 June 2019.
 Newstalk ZB (discussing allegations of sexual assault at Parliament) 23 May 2019.
 AmbitionNZ Interview (discussing the meaning of ambition) 6 March 2019.
 RadioNZ The Panel, with John Pulu (on various subjects) 26 February 2019.
 RadioNZ (on cultural and linguistic diversity in courts) 3 February 2019.
 Stuff’s What Women Want panel celebrating 125 years of women’s suffrage 19 September 2018.
 Appearance in Human Rights Commission “Still Striving for Equality” video for 125 years of women’s suffrage 18 September 2018.
 NBR Interview (discussing diverse thinking in NZ Boardrooms) 23 August 2018.
 TVNZ Breakfast Interview (discussing diverse thinking in NZ Boardrooms, following the launch of the Diverse Thinking Capability Audit report) 22 August 2018.
 RadioNZ The Panel, with Allan Blackman (on various subjects) 21 August 2018.
 WorkSafe Insights – Championing Health and Safety with Nicole Rosie (discussing challenges for work health and safety in a superdiverse environment) 14 August 2018.
 The Spinoff – Business is Boring Podcast Interview (on the need for Asian leaders in NZ businesses) 3 August 2018.
 RadioNZ The Panel, with Guy Williams (on various subjects) 28 June 2018.
 RadioNZ (on diversity of public sector boards) 7 May 2018.
 RadioNZ The Panel, with Jock Anderson (on various subjects) 2 May 2018.
 RadioNZ The Panel, with Michael Moynihan (on various subjects) 14 March 2018.
 Newstalk ZB Interview (discussing New Zealand’s changing gender parity) 8 March 2018.
 TVNZ Seven Sharp (on offering a Mandarin translation for Chinese clients on her legal services app) 21 February 2018.

References

External links
 Public Law Toolbox Chambers website
 New Zealand Asian Leaders website
 Superdiversity for Law, Policy and Business website

New Zealand people of Chinese descent
Taiwanese emigrants to New Zealand
New Zealand women lawyers
Harvard Law School alumni
University of Otago alumni
Academic staff of the Victoria University of Wellington
New Zealand people of Taiwanese descent
People educated at Otago Girls' High School
Living people
New Zealand Women of Influence Award recipients
Year of birth missing (living people)
20th-century New Zealand lawyers
21st-century New Zealand lawyers